The scarlet-rumped cacique (Cacicus uropygialis) is a passerine bird species in the New World family Icteridae. It breeds from eastern Honduras to Panama and in the Pacific lowlands of South America from western Colombia south to Ecuador, and in the lower reaches of the northern Andes. There are several subspecies, some of which have been proposed for elevation to full species status.

As a whole, C. uropygialis it is usually called the scarlet-rumped cacique. However, it is often split into two species, in which case this name is limited to Cacicus (uropygialis) microrhynchus (with subspecies pacificus), while the nominate subspecies, C. u. uropygialis, is referred to as the subtropical cacique. The "true" scarlet-rumped cacique - then Cacicus microrhynchus - may also be split further; the Pacific populations have been proposed as the Pacific cacique (Cacicus pacificus). The AOU considers it likely that at least two species are involved, but points out that no dedicated analysis of the data at hand has been published. It therefore does not formally recognize the split at present.

Description
The scarlet-rumped cacique is sexually dimorphic like many Icteridae, though it mainly concerns size in this species. This cacique is a slim long-winged bird, with a relatively short tail, blue eyes, and a pale yellow pointed bill. It has mainly black plumage, apart from a scarlet patch on the lower back and upper rump. The female is smaller and a duller black than the male, and the juvenile bird has a brownish tone to the plumage and a brownish-orange rump.

The song of these birds is a pleasant , but the Pacific cacique has a descending melancholy . The calls birds give to members differ between the three groups: those of the subtropical cacique sound rather atypical for icterids and more like the chatter of an excited great thrush (Turdus fuscater).

Ecology and distribution

The scarlet-rumped and Pacific caciques are birds associated with humid lowland primary forest or old secondary forest at up to  ASL. The scarlet-rumped cacique is found from Honduras, through Nicaragua and Costa Rica, to Panama (except Darién), while the Pacific cacique is found from eastern Panama (Darién), through western Colombia, to western Ecuador.

Their habitat has a lower canopy than that of their lowland relatives, dominated by trees of little more than  height, for example oaks (Quercus). Epiphytes, hemiepiphytes like Coussapoa (Urticaceae), and a usually dense understory with tree ferns, Ericaceae, etc. are also typical habitat features.

These caciques forage through the canopy in small flocks. It feeds on large insects, spiders and small vertebrates, but will also take some fruit. It often forms mixed-species feeding flocks with similarly robust and rowdy songbirds, such as other icterids, black-faced grosbeaks (Caryothraustes poliogaster), or American jays. Such noisy flocks may also attract trogons or flycatchers.

Unlike some other caciques they are not usually colonial breeders; like them they have a bag-shaped nest. The normal clutch is two dark-blotched white eggs. The male will assist in feeding the young, but does not incubate.

The IUCN conservation status of Least Concern applies for the taxon in the broad sense. Both the scarlet-rumped (in the narrower sense) and the Pacific cacique are widespread and locally common. The subtropical cacique is generally uncommon to rare, but due to its extensive range unlikely to be seriously threatened.

Footnotes

References
 Jaramillo, Alvaro & Burke, Peter (1999): New World Blackbirds. Christopher Helm, London. 
 Salaman, Paul G.W.; Stiles, F. Gary; Bohórquez, Clara Isabel; Álvarez-R., Mauricio; Umaña, Ana María; Donegan, Thomas M. & Cuervo, Andrés M. (2002): New and noteworthy bird records from the east slope of the Andes of Colombia. Caldasia 24(1): 157–189. PDF fulltext
 South American Classification Committee (SACC) (2003): Proposal #73 – Split Cacicus microrhynchus from C. uropygialis.
 Stiles, F. Gary & Skutch, Alexander Frank (1989): A guide to the birds of Costa Rica. Comistock, Ithaca. 

scarlet-rumped cacique
scarlet-rumped cacique
Birds of Nicaragua
Birds of Costa Rica
Birds of Panama
Birds of Colombia
Birds of Ecuador
Birds of the Peruvian Amazon
Birds of the Venezuelan Amazon
scarlet-rumped cacique
scarlet-rumped cacique
scarlet-rumped cacique